Marnus Schoeman (born 9 February 1989) is a South African rugby union player for the  in Super Rugby and the  in the Currie Cup. His regular playing position is openside flanker.

Rugby career

Schoeman previously played for Griquas and the Blue Bulls. He has also played for Tuks in the Varsity Cup.

He was a member of the Pumas side that won the Vodacom Cup for the first time in 2015, beating  24–7 in the final.

He joined the  Super Rugby side on loan for the 2017 season.

International

Schoeman represented South Africa U20 at the 2009 IRB Junior World Championship in Japan and made 5 appearances.

References

External links
 itsrugby.co.uk profile

1989 births
Living people
People from Edenvale, Gauteng
South African rugby union players
Rugby union flankers
Griquas (rugby union) players
Blue Bulls players
South Africa Under-20 international rugby union players
Rugby union players from Gauteng
Pumas (Currie Cup) players
Bulls (rugby union) players
Lions (United Rugby Championship) players
Golden Lions players
FC Grenoble players